Keep On Runnin'  is the third and final album by funk group Black Heat. It was released in 1975 and produced by the legendary Joel Dorn and Jimmy Douglass.

Track listing
"Drive My Car" (John Lennon, Paul McCartney) - 3:05
"Zimba Ku" - 4:31 	
"Questions & Conclusions" - 4:09 	
"Something Extra" - 3:52 
"Feel Like a Child" - 3:48
"Last Dance" - 2:38
"Baby You'll See" - 4:05
"Love" - 3:16 	
"Prince Duval" - 4:20
"Live Together" - 2:49 	
"Keep On Runnin'" - 5:48

Personnel
Johnell Gray - Keyboards, vocals
Naamon Jones - Bass, lead vocals
James Duval - Lead guitar, rhythm guitar
Esco Cromer - Drums
Rodney Edwards - Trumpet, flugelhorn
Ray Thompson - Saxophone, flute
Raymond Green - Congas
Jimmy Douglass, Rodney Edwards - Bass
Randy Brecker - Tenor saxophone
Michael Brecker - Horn
Tom Malone - Trombone 
Ken Bichel - Synthesizer

Charts

External links
 Black Heat-Keep On Runnin'  at Discogs

References

1975 albums
Atlantic Records albums